Protium panamense is a species of plant in the Burseraceae family. It is found in Costa Rica and Panama. It is becoming rare due to habitat loss.

References

panamense
Near threatened plants
Taxonomy articles created by Polbot